The Matra-Simca MS670 was a Group 5 prototype race car introduced in 1972 for the World Championship for Makes. The MS670 replaced the previous Matra-Simca MS660C.

Racing history

1972
The MS670 only made one appearance in 1972, the 24 Hours of Le Mans. Matra entered four cars, Jean-Pierre Beltoise/Chris Amon in the older Matra-Simca MS660C, François Cevert/Howden Ganley, Henri Pescarolo/Graham Hill and Jean-Pierre Jabouille/David Hobbs. Hill/Pescarolo won the race by a lap from Cevert/Ganley. Beltoise/Amon retired with engine failure and Jabouille/Hobbs retired with a broken gearbox.

In the World Championship for Makes, Matra had scored twenty points, earning it seventh in the championship.

1973

The first race of the season was the 1973 24 Hours of Daytona and Matra entered one car using the MS670 driven by Cevert/Beltoise/Pescarolo and retired from the race with engine failure. The driver line ups for the 1973 Vallelunga 6 Hours were Cevert/Beltoise and Cevert/Pescarolo/Gérard Larrousse, all drivers using the new Matra-Simca MS670B, Cevert/Pescarolo/Larrousse won and Cevert/Beltoise retired with engine failure. The driver line ups for the next two races, starting with the 1973 1000km of Dijon were Cevert/Beltoise and Pescarolo/Larrousse. Pescarolo/Larrousse won the race and Cevert/Beltoise finished third. The 1000km of Monza saw Pescarolo/Larrousse third and Cevert/Beltoise eleventh. The driver line ups for the 1000 km of Spa were Pescarolo/Amon/Hill and Pescarolo/Larrousse/Amon, Pescarolo/Larrousse/Amon finished third and Pescarolo/Amon/Hill retired with engine failure. The team skipped the Targa Florio but entered the 1000km of Nürburgring with Cevert/Beltoise and Pescarolo/Larrousse driving but both cars retired with engine failure. Matra entered four cars for the 24 Hours of Le Mans, Pescarolo/Larrousse, Cevert/Beltoise, Jabouille/Jean-Pierre Jaussaud and Patrick Depailler/Bob Wollek. Pescarolo/Larrousse won the race, Jabouille/Jaussaud finished third, Cevert/Beltoise retired with an accident caused by a puncture and Depailler/Wollek also retired with a broken oil pump and engine failure. The 1000km of Zeltweg returned to two cars with Pescarolo/Larrousse winning the race from Cevert/Beltoise. In the final race of the 1973 season, the Watkins Glen 6 Hours, Pescarolo/Larrousse won but Cevert/Beltoise retired with broken ignition.

In the World Championship for Makes, Matra had scored one hundred and twenty four points, earning it first-place in the standings.

1974

The first race of the season was the 1000km of Monza and the driver line ups were Pescarolo/Larrousse and Beltoise/Jean-Pierre Jarier but both cars retired with engine failure using the new Matra-Simca MS670C. The driver line ups for the 1000 km of Spa were Jarier/Jacky Ickx and Pescarolo/Larrousse, Jarier/Ickx won the race and Pescarolo/Larrousse retired with a broken head gasket. The 1000km of Nürburgring saw Beltoise/Jarier and Pescarolo/Larrousse driving. Beltoise/Jarier won the race and Pescarolo/Larrousse finished fifth. Pescarolo/Larrousse won the 1000km of Imola and Beltoise/Jarier finished fourth. Matra entered four cars for the 24 Hours of Le Mans, Pescarolo/Larrousse, Jabouille/François Migault, Jaussaud/Wollek/José Dolhem and Beltoise/Jarier in the new Matra-Simca MS680. Pescarolo/Larrousse won the race, Jabouille/Migault finished third, both Jaussaud/Wollek/Dolhem and Beltoise/Jarier retired with engine failure. The 1000km of Zeltweg returned to two cars with Pescarolo/Larrousse winning the race and Beltoise/Jarier finishing third. The team returned to the MS670C for the remainder of the season. Beltoise/Jarier won the Watkins Glen 6 Hours and Pescarolo/Larrousse retired with a broken gear shift lever. In both the 1000km of Le Castellet and 1000km of Brands Hatch Beltoise/Jarier won from Pescarolo/Larrousse. For the final race of the 1974 season, the Kyalami 6 Hours, Pescarolo/Larrousse won from Beltoise/Jarier.

In the World Championship for Makes, Matra had scored one hundred and forty points, earning it first in the championship for the second consecutive season but at the end of the year Matra pulled out of motor racing.

Complete World Championship for Makes results

References 

Matra vehicles
Sports prototypes
24 Hours of Le Mans race cars
Le Mans winning cars
Mid-engined cars
Cars introduced in 1972